Tanqa Tanqa (Aymara for beetle, Hispanicized spelling Tanca Tanca, also Tanka Tanka) or Tanka Tanka (Aymara tanka hat or biretta, the reduplication indicates that there is a group of something, "many hats (or birettas)") is an archaeological site in Peru. It is located in the Puno Region, Chucuito Province, Zepita District. The site was declared a National Cultural Heritage (Patrimonio Cultural) of Peru.

References

Archaeological sites in Puno Region
Archaeological sites in Peru